Atomism is a philosophical concept that all things are composed of fundamental indivisible parts.

Atomism may refer to:

 Atomism, the natural philosophy pertaining to the fundamental composition of the physical world
 Atomism (logical), a doctrine that the world consists of fundamental facts
 Atomism (social), a doctrine that individuals are the fundamental, and pre-eminent, components of society

See also 
 Atomistic (disambiguation)